Charles Marion Edwards (born September 13, 1960) is an American politician serving as the U.S. representative for North Carolina's 11th congressional district since 2023. A member of the Republican Party, he represented the 48th district in the North Carolina Senate from 2016 to 2023.

Early life and education 
Edwards was born in Waynesville, North Carolina. He graduated from West Henderson High School in 1978 and studied business, accounting, and marketing at Blue Ridge Community College.

Career

Edwards joined McDonald's in 1989, working as an operations manager until 1991, senior business consultant from 1991 to 1996, and development coordinator from 1996 to 1998. He also worked as the vice president of Henderson County Partners for Economic Progress. In 2013, he became a director of Entegra Financial Corporation. In 2020, Entegra merged with First Citizens Bank.

Edwards was appointed to the North Carolina Senate in August 2016 after Tom Apodaca resigned. He defeated Democratic nominee Norman Bossert in 2016, and was reelected in 2018 and 2020.

U.S. House of Representatives

Elections

2022 

On November 30, 2021, Edwards declared his candidacy for North Carolina's 11th congressional district in the 2022 election. The district was represented by freshman Republican incumbent Madison Cawthorn. Cawthorn faced numerous scandals, had made a number of controversial statements, and was criticized by Edwards as an ineffective legislator. Edwards was also endorsed by U.S. Senator Thom Tillis. 

On May 17, 2022, Edwards defeated Cawthorn in the Republican primary with 33.4% of the vote. Although he lost 12 of the district's 15 counties, he carried Buncombe, its most populous, by over 2,000 votes, exceeding his overall margin of 1,338. Edwards also defeated Cawthorn in Henderson County by 3,191 votes. Henderson is home to both Edwards and Cawthorn.

Personal life 
Edwards and his wife, Teresa, have had two children. In 2018, his son died unexpectedly.

References

External links
 Congressman Chuck Edwards official U.S. House website
 Campaign website
 
 

|-

|-

1960 births
21st-century American politicians
Living people
People from Waynesville, North Carolina
Republican Party members of the United States House of Representatives from North Carolina
Republican Party North Carolina state senators